Daniel de Oliveira Sechi (born 22 April 1970) is a retired Venezuelan football midfielder who coached the Venezuelan U-15 and U-17 national soccer teams.  He is the Elite FIFA coaching instructor for Colegio de Entrenadores (Instructor #026) and Federacion Venezolana de Futbol.

He is considered by Venezuelan soccer experts such as Richard Paez, Jorge Duran, Rodolfo Paladini among others) as the most prepared and potential coach of his country. He has been the ambassador of Copa Coca-Cola for three consecutive years. Among his advisors, tutors, teachers and coaches during his career are Juan Osorio (Colombia), Alberto Villalobos (VEN), his father Celso De Oliveira (BRA), Luis Molina (Perú), Arnold Ramirez (Costa Rica), John Ramirez (Colombia), Rafael Amaya (Colombia), Alfonso Mondelo (actual Soccer Director of MLS), Bruce Arena (USA), Bob Bradley (USA), Manolo Contreras (VEN), José "Pepito" Hernández (Spain), Jupp Heynckes (GER), Paco Rielo (Spain), Mike Jeffries (USA), Alvaro "Pitillo" Valencia (Colombia), Mariano Moreno (RFEF), Ignacio Prieto (Chile), Kiril Dojčinovski (Macedonia), Roberto Falcòn (Spain), Aaron Winter (NED), Ruud Dokter (NED), Wim Koevermans (NED). Joaquin Alonso (RFEF), Vicente Miera (Olympic gold medal at Barcelona 92), among others.

Player

Youth
De Oliveira attended the Claret School where he was the 1979, 1981, 1982, 1984 and 1986 Athlete of the Year.  He is the school's all-time leading scorer (576 goals) and a five-times champion of the Eastern Intercollegiate League of Venezuela.  During those years, he was also the 1986 and 1987 Junior National Select Team Program (LIDES) Player of the Year.  In 1987, De Oliveira moved to the United States to attend Long Island University. While there, he played on the university soccer team from 1987 to 1990.  In 1987, Soccer America named him to its All Freshmen Team.  Daniel was the top scorer of the team in 1987 and 1990. He was also named the 1987 Northeast Conference Rookie of the Year. He finished his collegiate career with thirty-five goals making him among the all-time scoring leaders of his alma mater. While in college, he also played indoor soccer during the winter.  He was part of the 1988 U-19 MITRE Indoor Soccer National Championship team Hotta Bavarian SC in Baltimore. During that tournament, Daniel was named ALL TOURNAMENT TEAM along his teammates Tony Meola and John Maessner.

Professional
After graduation, de Oliveira pursued his professional career in Venezuela, Brasil, USA, Spain, and El Salvador. He was with C.D. Luis Ángel Firpo of the El Salvadoran Primera División de Fútbol Profesional during the 1995-1996 season. In July 1995, he signed with the Dallas Sidekicks as a free agent and played 3 games with the team in early 1996. In February 1996, D.C. United selected de Oliveira in the 12th round (120th overall) of the 1996 MLS Inaugural Player Draft. He signed with United, but was waived on April 16, 1996, during the season International players League roster reduction. He was offered by coach Bruce Arena to stay with the Virginia affiliated team, Richmond Kikcers, but decided to leave the team. On August 5, 1997, the Staten Island Vipers of USISL signed De Oliveira.
 As Beach Soccer player- 2005 Venezuela National Beach soccer Championship 1st place
 Venezuelan Beach Soccer National team player at CONMEBOL World Cup qualifying Tournament in Macaé, Brasil / 4th place.

National team
 Member of the Venezuela National Team (7 Caps)
 Member of the Venezuela U-23 Olympic National Team.
 '98 World Cup qualifying Venezuela National Team
 Member of the Venezuelan National Beach soccer Team (4th place Macae, Brazil 2006)

Manager
De Oliveira pursued a coaching career being the only Venezuelan coach holding a KNVB (Netherlands Federation) Match Analysis Certification, USSF (USA Federation) A Licence, all 3 levels of FIFA FUTURE III coaching Instructor certification, FIFA GRASSROOT certification and a FIFA SPORTS MANAGEMENT DIPLOMA.  Also, Daniel has represented South America in five (5) AEFCA Symposiums (Split 2012, Antalya 2013, Zagreb 2014, Como and 2016 Belgrado 2017) for top coaches in Europe. He was the Technical Director (soccer director) of 1st Division Team in Venezuela Deportivo Petare FC for 4 years and recently 1st Div Head coach at Metropolitanos FC in Venezuela. He has coached the Venezuelan U-15 and U-17 national soccer teams since 2007. He is actually an official FIFA coaching instructor for South America and the Caribbean. He also took the U-15 Venezuela National team to obtain a group 2nd place tied with Uruguay, becoming the best Venezuelan youth team performance in a Conmebol U-15 tournament. He scouted and coached National Team of Venezuela players such as Fernando Aristeguieta (America de Cali), Josef Martinez (Atlanta United MLS), Alexander González (Huesca, Spain), Juanpi Añor (Malaga FC), Josmar Zambrano (Zulia FC), Romulo Otero (Atletico Mineiro of Brazil), Carlos Rivero (Dep. Táchira), Diego Garcia (Carabobo FC), Oscar Gonzalez (Dep. La Guaira), Bernardo Añor (former USF and Columbus Crew player), among others. Most recently he has advised and helped the prestigious Seminoles women's soccer program to sign Deyna Castellano known as The Queen of soccer in her native country, Venezuela. She was scouted by Daniel during the Copa Coca-Cola. Daniel was the ambassador of Copa Coca-Cola.

His great relationship in the world of soccer has allowed him to continually visit several elite football programs around the world and learn from entities such as Real Madrid, Sporting Gijon, Dinamo Zagreb, Fluminense FC, Rio Grande Valley FC, the Spanish Federation, LA Galaxy among others.

Most recently, as a coach He took Yaracuyanos FC, a very young average team, to the 1st place of the Central Group of Torneo Clausura "Permanencia" and his team was unbeaten for 10 consecutive games having a record of 7 wins and 3 T.  In March 2016 Daniel was called to be part of the most successful Club in Venezuela, Caracas FC. There, He helped the club to create a new strategic soccer plan.
 2000 Coach of the year of The LIGA CARACAS, Venezuela
 2002–2003–2005 Coach of the Year Caracas Intercollegial select teams League, Venezuela
 2003 U-14 Venezuela National Champion. (Head coach Miranda State ODP)
 2006 Brazil / FIFA Beach soccer South American qualifying round 4th place - Venezuela National team (2006-Macae, Brasil)
 2006 Barcelona Junior International World Cup 1st place with the U-14 and U12
 2006 Barcelona Junior International World Cup runner-up U-16
 Venezuela National Team Head coach / 2007 Porto Alegre CONMEBOL U-15
 Venezuela National Team Head coach / 2009 Chile U-17 CONMEBOL Venezuela National Team Head coach / Bolivarian games Bronze Medal
 Venezuela Elite FIFA Coaching Instructor 
 International Elite Guest at AEFCA Football Symposiums in Split, Croacia 2012
 International Elite Guest at AEFCA Football Symposiums in Antalya, Turkey 2013
 International Elite Guest at AEFCA Football Symposiums in Zagreb, Croacia 2014
 International Elite Guest at AEFCA Football Symposiums in Como, Italia 2016
 Central Group Champions 2015 with Yaracuyanos FC

References

External links
 
 Dallas Sidekicks Players - Kicks

1970 births
Living people
Footballers from Caracas
Venezuelan footballers
Deportivo Italia players
C.D. Luis Ángel Firpo footballers
Trujillanos FC players
Staten Island Vipers players
Carabobo F.C. players
Dallas Sidekicks (CISL) players
USISL players
Venezuela international footballers
Venezuelan expatriate footballers
Expatriate footballers in El Salvador
Venezuelan football managers
Association football forwards
Venezuelan expatriate sportspeople in El Salvador
Venezuelan expatriate sportspeople in Brazil
Venezuelan expatriate sportspeople in the United States
Venezuelan expatriate sportspeople in Spain
Association football midfielders
Yaracuyanos F.C. managers
Metropolitanos F.C. managers
Estudiantes de Caracas S.C. managers